Meri Zindagi Hai Tu (English lit ; My Life is You) is a 2014 Pakistani drama serial directed by Amin Iqbal, produced by A&B Entertainment and written by Faiza Iftikhar. The drama stars Ahsan Khan, Maya Ali and Aiza Khan in lead roles. The drama was first aired 20 September 2013 on Geo Entertainment, being aired on prime slot on Friday at 8:00 pm. The serial also aired on Indian channel Zindagi (TV Channel) under the same title.

Cast

Ahsan Khan
Maya Ali
Ayeza Khan
Shehryar Zaidi
Ismat Zaidi
Seemi Pasha
Faisal Naqvi
Noushaba Javed 
Yasir Shoro
Tehreem Zuberi
Aijaz Aslam

References

Pakistani drama television series
2014 Pakistani television series endings
2013 Pakistani television series debuts